Burning Sands is a 1922 American silent drama film directed by George Melford and written by Olga Printzlau and Waldemar Young based upon the novel of the same name by Arthur Weigall. The film stars Wanda Hawley, Milton Sills, Louise Dresser, Jacqueline Logan, Robert Cain, Fenwick Oliver, and Winter Hall. The film was released on September 3, 1922, by Paramount Pictures. It is not known whether the film currently survives, which suggests that it is a lost film.

Paramount hoped the production would enjoy the same success to the similarly-themed hit The Sheik produced by the studio the previous year.

Plot
As described in a film magazine review, a kindly old sheik is being deceived by his villainous son, who seeks to destroy his father by uniting with the enemy tribe. However, the plan is foiled by a young English philosopher who lives alone at the oasis. In the ensuing battle the villain is killed, leaving the way clear for the happy marriage of the philosopher and the young woman he loves.

Cast

References

Bibliography
 Michelakis, Pantelis & Wyke, Maria. The Ancient World in Silent Cinema. Cambridge University Press, 2013.

External links

1922 films
1922 lost films
Silent American drama films
1922 drama films
Paramount Pictures films
Films directed by George Melford
American black-and-white films
American silent feature films
Films based on British novels
1920s American films
1920s English-language films